Leucotmemis is a genus of moths in the subfamily Arctiinae. The genus was erected by Arthur Gardiner Butler in 1876.

Species

References

External links

"Leucotmemis". Encyclopedia of Life.

 
Euchromiina
Moth genera